In North Carolina, Down East refers to two areas of Eastern North Carolina. The first is the historical group of coastal communities east of Beaufort in Carteret County. The second is anywhere east of I-95 in North Carolina in the coastal plain region.

Carteret County 
Down East historically refers to the group of communities east of Beaufort in Carteret County in the coastal plain region of the state. These communities are Bettie, Otway, Straits, Harkers Island, Gloucester, Marshallberg, Tusk, Smyrna, Williston, Davis, Stacy, Masontown, Sea Level, Atlantic and Cedar Island. Many residents of these communities feature a High Tider ("Hoi Toider") accent, a dialect remnant of Elizabethan English that was once spoken in colonial Carolina. This dialect is indigenous to the lowland areas of North Carolina, in combination with the general southern accent of the Southeastern region. The area is a major fishing area, including shrimping and blue crabs.

Eastern North Carolina 
The term Down East has broadened in usage over the years to refer to Eastern North Carolina in general or more specifically the central coastal plain of the state, roughly where the Pamlico Sound watershed is between the Tar-Pamlico and Neuse river basins. Towns and cities in the watershed include but are not limited to Greenville, Goldsboro, Kinston, New Bern, Rocky Mount, Tarboro, Washington, and Wilson.

There are a number of organizations and events with Down East in the name. Organizations include the Down East Partnership for Children in Rocky Mount and the Class A-Advanced minor-league baseball team Down East Wood Ducks that plays in Kinston. WRQM is a public radio station formerly known as Down East Radio and was hosted out of North Carolina Wesleyan College. Events include the Down East Holiday Show in Greenville and the Down East Music Festival and Elizabeth City State University's Down East Viking Football Classic, both in Rocky Mount.

See also 
Down East, the name for part or all of coastal Maine
Inner Banks, a name for the coastal region of North Carolina that is inland from the Outer Banks

References

External links
Down East Attractions and Restaurants
Coastal guide website

Geography of North Carolina
Geography of Carteret County, North Carolina